Ferenc Vörös (born 9 April 1922) is a Hungarian retired swimmer who won a silver medal in the 1500 m freestyle at the 1947 European Aquatics Championships. He competed in the same event at the 1948 Summer Olympics, but did not reach the finals.

References

1922 births
Living people
Swimmers at the 1948 Summer Olympics
Olympic swimmers of Hungary
Hungarian male swimmers
European Aquatics Championships medalists in swimming
Hungarian male freestyle swimmers
Swimmers from Budapest